Justin Dallas Kurzel (born 1974) is an Australian film director and screenwriter.

Early life
Kurzel was born  1974 in Gawler, South Australia to a family with immigrant roots, his father hailing from Poland and his mother from Malta. His younger brother, Jed Kurzel, is a blues rock musician who has scored most of Justin's films.

Career
In 1999 he was awarded a Mike Walsh Fellowship. His film debut was the Australian short film Blue Tongue (2004). His feature film debut was Snowtown (2011), for which he won the AACTA Award for Best Direction. Though controversial for its violence, the film was generally praised and holds an 84% on Rotten Tomatoes with the critic consensus: "It's a bleak and brutal endurance test, but for viewers with the strength and patience to make it to the end, Snowtown will prove an uncommonly powerful viewing experience."

His 2015 film adaptation of William Shakespeare's Macbeth was selected to compete for the Palme d'Or at the 2015 Cannes Film Festival.

In 2016, Kurzel directed Assassin's Creed (2016), based on the video game franchise of the same name.

Kurzel directed True History of the Kelly Gang in 2018, adapted from Peter Carey's 2001 Man Booker Prize-winning novel of the same name, written from the viewpoint of legendary Australian bushranger and outlaw Ned Kelly. The film premiered at the 2019 Toronto International Film Festival and was released in Australian cinemas in 2020.

Kurzel will direct multiple episodes of Apple TV's television adaptation of the 2003 novel Shantaram.

Personal life
Kurzel is married to actress Essie Davis.  They have twin daughters.

Filmography

References

External links
 

1974 births
Living people
Australian film directors
Australian people of Maltese descent
Australian people of Polish descent
Australian screenwriters
People from Gawler, South Australia